Giuseppe Ponsat (born 21 September 1995) is an Italian professional football player who plays for Serie D club Arzachena.

External links

1995 births
Footballers from Turin
Living people
Italian footballers
Association football forwards
U.S.D. Novese players
S.S.D. Correggese Calcio 1948 players
Forlì F.C. players
A.C. Monza players
A.C. Reggiana 1919 players
Serie C players
Serie D players